The Shinshu Brave Warriors is a professional basketball team that competes in the first division of the Japanese B.League. The team was formed in 2011 and as of the 2016-17 season played in the Central Division (Naka-chiku) of the B2 League. The team name comes from a desire to show the tradition of the Nagano prefecture, formerly called Shinshu. And to liken the players to the ninja and samurai warriors who fought and trained in the area in times past. Their official home is in Chikuma City, just south of the prefectural capital of Nagano City, however games are sometimes played in Nagano itself or in other nearby cities such as Matsumoto.

Team Logo 

The team logo uses three colours; blue (called Warrior Blue), silver (called Japan Alps Silver) and yellow (called Obasute Moon Yellow). It shows the full name of the team with a depiction of the Japanese Alps mountain range (which runs through Nagano) and a basketball shown as a moon coming over the mountains.

Mascot 

The team mascot is a bear like creature called "Burea".  When pronounced sound like blair or blayer.  It probably comes from a combination of Brave and Warriors; Bra-ior.  Japanese tend to pronounce the -er as a long a when using English words.  His design includes white for the winter snow, crescent moons for eyes and an apple for the nose (Nagano is known for its apples).

Roster

Notable players

Coaches
Motofumi Aoki
Takatoshi Ishibashi
Ryuji Kawai
Koju Munakata
Ryutaro Onodera
Michael Katsuhisa

Arenas
Kotobuki Arena Chikuma
Chikuma City Togura Gymnasium
Matsumoto City Gymnasium
White Ring
Big Hat

References
http://basketball.asia-basket.com/team/Japan/Shinshu_Brave_Warriors_Nagano/15967

 
Basketball teams in Japan
Sports teams in Nagano Prefecture
Basketball teams established in 2011
2011 establishments in Japan